Alexios "Alexis" Kougias (born on 24 January 1951 in Petroupolis, Athens) is a Greek penologist, lawyer, former football player and football administrator.

Law career
He studied law at the University of Thessaloniki and at the University of Athens, from where he graduated. Ηe first generated publicity in 1978, as an advocate of notorious criminal Vangelis Rochamis. He also practiced criminal law in known cases, including "the trial of Satanists", the trial of Argyris Saliarelis, the trial Express Samina disaster, the trial of the terrorist organizations and ELA and 17 November Group. In December 2008 he took over the defense of the policeman who fatally shot 15 year old Alexis Grigoropoulos. According to his statements, he has taken 17,500 trials, including 5,000 felonies.

Football career

He started playing football for Aris Petroupolis at the age of 18 in the second Division. He played for Olympiakos Loutraki. In 1973, he was transferred to Iraklis Thessaloniki and was called in the Greece National team, but that same year injury from a car accident forced him to take 18 months leave. In 1978, he returned to Olympiakos Loutraki and later at Pelops Kiato.

Along with his career as a lawyer, he participated in sport. In 1997 and 2004 he served as president of AEK Athens, for short periods of time. On other occasions, he was president of Korinthos, Aris Petroupolis, Veria, PAS Giannina, Lamia and Panahaiki. Also he has represented Iraklis at the EPAE committee. In late 2008 he took over the presidency of Panachaiki 2005 and in May 2009 he took over ss major stakeholder, previously held by Kostas Makris.

References

External links

  
 

20th-century Greek lawyers
Greek football chairmen and investors
Living people
1951 births
AEK Athens F.C. chairmen
Iraklis Thessaloniki F.C. players
Athlitiki Enosi Larissa F.C.
Association footballers not categorized by position
Footballers from Athens
Greek footballers
Aristotle University of Thessaloniki alumni
National and Kapodistrian University of Athens alumni
21st-century Greek lawyers